The 2010–11 Hampton Pirates men's basketball team represented Hampton University during the 2010–11 NCAA Division I men's basketball season. The Pirates, led by second year head coach Edward Joyner, played their home games at the Hampton Convocation Center and were members of the Mid-Eastern Athletic Conference. They finished the season 24–9, 11–5 in MEAC play to finish in second place. The defeated Maryland Eastern Shore, Norfolk State, and Morgan State to become champions of the MEAC tournament. They received an automatic bid to the NCAA tournament where they lost in the opening round to Duke.

Roster

Schedule

|-
!colspan=9 style=| Regular season

|-
!colspan=9 style=| MEAC tournament

|-
!colspan=9 style=| NCAA tournament

References

Hampton Pirates men's basketball seasons
Hampton
Hampton Pirates men's basketball
Hampton
Hampton Pirates